Slocan may refer to:

Communities
 Slocan, British Columbia or Slocan City, a village in the Slocan Valley, British Columbia, Canada
 Slocan Valley or Slocan Country or Silvery Slocan, a valley in British Columbia, Canada
 Slocan Park, British Columbia, an unincorporated settlement in the Slocan Valley, British Columbia, Canada
 South Slocan, British Columbia, an unincorporated community on the Kootenay River, British Columbia, Canada
 Slocan (electoral district), a provincial electoral district in the Canadian province of British Columbia from 1903 to 1920

Rivers and lakes
 Slocan River,  tributary of the Kootenay River in British Columbia, Canada
 Little Slocan River, a tributary of the Slocan River in British Columbia, Canada
 Slocan Lake, a lake in the Slocan Valley, British Columbia, Canada

See also
 Kaslo-Slocan, a provincial electoral district in the Canadian province of British Columbia from 1924 to 1963
 Kaslo and Slocan Railway, a narrow gauge railway in the West Kootenay, British Columbia, Canada
 Nakusp and Slocan Railway, a historic Canadian railway that operated in southeastern British Columbia, Canada